The Joint Conference on Digital Libraries (JCDL) is an annual international forum focusing on digital libraries and associated technical, practical, and social issues. It is jointly sponsored by the Association for Computing Machinery and the IEEE Computer Society. It was formed in 2000 by combining the ACM Digital Libraries Conference (DL) and the IEEE CS Advances in Digital Libraries (ADL) Conference.

Conferences
 JCDL 2018 - held in Wuhan (China) from August 1 to August 5  Proceedings []
 JCDL 2019 - held in Urbana-Champaign (Illinois) (UIUC) from June 2 to June 6  Proceedings 
 JCDL 2020 - held in Wuhan Hubei (China) from August 1 to August 5  Proceedings  
 JCDL 2021 - hosted online by the University of Illinois School of Information Sciences Urbana-Champaign from September 27 to September 30 
 JCDL 2022 - held in Cologne (Germany) and hosted online from June 20 to June 24

Awards
The conference awards the Vannevar Bush prize for best paper, best student paper, best international paper and best poster, presented to participants who have made outstanding contribution to this field. The conference invites papers on the wide range of topics of interest in this field, to the national and international community.

External links
 Joint Conference on Digital Libraries

Digital libraries
Association for Computing Machinery conferences
IEEE conferences